The 1979 Campeonato Nacional was Chilean football top tier's 47th season. Colo-Colo was the tournament's champion, winning its twelfth title.

Standings

Results

Topscorers

Liguilla Pre-Copa Libertadores

Liguilla Play-off match 

O'Higgins qualified to 1980 Copa Libertadores

Promotion/relegation Liguilla

* There was no promotion or relegation.

See also 
 1979 Copa Polla Gol

References

External links 
ANFP 
RSSSF Chile 1979

Primera División de Chile seasons
Chile
Prim